Statistics of Swiss Super League in the 1918–19 season.

East

Table

Central

Table

West

Table

Final

Table

Results 

|colspan="3" style="background-color:#D0D0D0" align=center|1 June 1919

|-
|colspan="3" style="background-color:#D0D0D0" align=center|15 June 1919

|-
|colspan="3" style="background-color:#D0D0D0" align=center|22 June 1919

|}

Etoile La Chaux-de-Fonds won the championship.

Sources 
 Switzerland 1918-19 at RSSSF

Seasons in Swiss football 
Swiss Football League seasons 
1918–19 in Swiss football
Swiss